is a Japanese handball player for Daido Steel and the Japanese national team.

He participated at the 2017 World Men's Handball Championship.

References

External links
 
 
 
 

1993 births
Living people
Japanese male handball players
Handball players at the 2018 Asian Games
Asian Games competitors for Japan
Handball players at the 2020 Summer Olympics
21st-century Japanese people